Segerstråle is a surname. Notable people with the surname include:

Lennart Segerstråle (1892–1975), Finnish painter
Martin Segerstråle (born 1984), Finnish music director
Ullica Segerstråle (born 1945), Finnish sociologist of science

See also
Hanna Frosterus-Segerstråle, Finnish artist